Daba Modibo Keïta (born 5 April 1981) is a Malian taekwondo athlete. Keïta has competed in international competitions since 1996, and in 2007 became the heavyweight (+84 kg) division 2007 World Taekwondo Champion in Beijing, and competed in both the 2008 and 2012 Summer Olympics in the +80 kg class.

Personal life
Keïta was born in Abidjan (Côte d'Ivoire) to Malian parents, and was named for the first President of Mali, Modibo Keita. He was forced to flee the country with his family in 2000 during the wave of xenophobia which preceded the Ivorian Civil War.  Settling in Mali, Keïta had little funding for training, but received an IOC Olympic Solidarity Scholarship to pay for his training with Ivorian fighter Patrice Remarck in the United States. With coach Jorge F. Ramos, finances forced Keïta to stay with friends in Beijing during the 2007 world championship and train in a hotel courtyard. Keïta is managed by his older brother, Badra, and has lived and trained in France and the United States.  Two of his brothers and two of his five sisters practice taekwondo, with his sisters both blue belts.

2007 world champion
Despite tearing a back muscle before the match, Keïta won the gold medal for the Heavyweight (84 kg) division 2007 World Taekwondo Champion in Beijing by beating Iranian Morteza Rostami 3 to −1 in the final. He is the first Sub-Saharan African to hold the title of Taekwondo World Champion, and has become a national hero in Mali. Keita himself has reflected that "Winning the world title was almost unthinkable for an African, or someone from a developing nation".

Keïta has become a national figure, making public appearances and meeting several times with the President Amadou Toumani Touré, who personally saw Keïta off to the Olympics. In part through Keïta's success, Taekwondo has exploded in popularity in the nation. In 2008 the Mali boasted over 150 clubs federated to the Fédération malienne de taekwondo (FEMAT) and 500 black belts among the almost 15,000 Malians who practise the sport.

2008 Olympic games
He represented Mali at the 2008 Summer Olympics in Beijing, and was favoured before the games to win the first Olympic Gold Medal for Mali in history. He was quoted in August saying "For any athlete the Olympic Games are a dream...  ...Africa really needs this medal."

Keïta was flag bearer for his nation at the opening ceremony, and competed in the 80 + kg Olympic division, beginning 23 August 2008. In the first round, Keïta defeated Mickael Justin Borot 6–5 to advance to the quarterfinals but was knocked out by eventual bronze medalist Nigerian Chika Yagazie Chukwumerije 3–2 in extra time.

Much expectation had been placed on the world champion in Mali, which had never won any Olympic medal.  After Keïta's loss, the president of Mali, Amadou Toumani Touré, was quoted in the state run paper l'Essor, saying that this was "A painful day for Mali". The paper announced the loss as "an immense disappointment for the nation."

2012 Olympic games
Keïta made it to the bronze medal match.  He was forced to withdraw due to injury from the scheduled match with Cuba's Robelis Despaigne allowing Despaigne to win the bronze medal due to walkover.

Achievements
1996 : Gold Medal at the West African Championship in Abidjan
1997 : Gold Medal at the West African Championship in Bamako
1999 : Bronze Medal at the West African Championship in Accra
2002, 2004 : champion of Mali
2004 : Gold Medal at the Paris Open Championship, in the Open international Open Championship of Nantes and in the Open Championship of Picardie
2005 : Gold Medal at the Paris Open Championship
2005 : Sportsmanship trophy in the 17th World Taekwondo Championships in Madrid
2005 : Gold Medal at the African Championship Madagascar
2005 : Gold Medal at the Coupe du monde francophone in Niamey (Niger).
2007 : Gold Medal at the 18th World Taekwondo Championships in Beijing (84 kg) as well as the trophy for MVP (Samsung Blue Passion Award).
2009 : Gold Medal at the 19th World Taekwondo Championships in Copenhagen. (84 kg)

See also
Mali at the 2008 Summer Olympics

References

Portions of this article were translated from the French language Wikipedia article .

External links
Beijing2008 athlete Profile.
Keita eyes Mali's first gold medal, Sports Illustrated, Caitlin C. Rhodes, 22 August 2008.

1981 births
Living people
Taekwondo practitioners at the 2008 Summer Olympics
Taekwondo practitioners at the 2012 Summer Olympics
Olympic taekwondo practitioners of Mali
Malian male taekwondo practitioners
Sportspeople from Abidjan
World Taekwondo Championships medalists
21st-century Malian people